This is a list of listed buildings in Slagelse Municipality, Denmark.

Listed buildings

4200 Slagelse

4220 Korsør

4230 Skælskør

4242 Boeslunde

4243 Rude

References

External links

 Danish Agency of Culture

 
Slagelse